Irmo may refer to;

 Irmo, South Carolina, a town in South Carolina, USA
 Irmo High School, a high school in the town
 Lórien (Vala), a character in the writings of J. R. R. Tolkien who is also named Irmo